Carol Ann Lee (born 1969) is an English author and biographer who has written extensively on Anne Frank, the Holocaust and on the crimes of Moors Murderers Myra Hindley and Ian Brady.

Early life and career
Carol Ann Lee was born in Wakefield, West Riding of Yorkshire. She studied History of Art and Design at university in Manchester and then followed her early interest, interviewing Holocaust survivors and working at the Manchester Jewish Museum. Her first book was published three years later.

Her tenth book, Evil Relations (2012), was nominated for the Crime Writers' Association's Gold Dagger Award for Non-Fiction. Written in conjunction with David Smith, chief prosecution witness in the Moors Murders case it details, for the first time, Smith's story in full.

In 2012, Lee published A Fine Day for a Hanging, a reexamination of Ruth Ellis's life story and the facts surrounding her trial for the murder of David Blakely and subsequent execution.

She is published by Mainstream Publishing, an imprint of Random House.

Works

2020, with Peter Howse. The Pottery Cottage Murders (Robinson)
2015, The Murders at White House Farm (London: Sidgwick & Jackson).
2012, A Fine Day for a Hanging: The Ruth Ellis Story (Edinburgh: Mainstream).
2011, with David Smith. Witness: The Story of David Smith, Chief Prosecution Witness in the Moors Murders Case (Edinburgh: Mainstream); published in 2012 as Evil Relations: The Man Who Bore Witness Against the Moors Murderers (Edinburgh: Mainstream).
2010, One of Your Own: The Life and Death of Myra Hindley (Edinburgh: Mainstream).
2007, The Winter of the World (Harper Perennial).
2006, Anne Frank and the Children of the Holocaust (Viking Press).
2003, The Hidden Life of Otto Frank (Penguin Books).
2001, Anne Frank's Story (Puffin Books).
2000, Roses from the Earth: The Biography of Anne Frank (Penguin Books).

References

1969 births
Living people
English biographers